Bibi Yanlu (also Romanized as Bībī Yānlū) is a village in Virmuni Rural District, in the Central District of Astara County, Gilan Province, Iran. At the 2006 census, its population was 42, in 10 families.

References 

Populated places in Astara County